Bendle Public School District is a public school district in Burton,  Genesee County in the U.S. state of Michigan and in the Genesee Intermediate School District.

History
On December 9, 2003, a consolidation vote for the three all Burton school districts took place with Atherton and Bentley voters in favor of consolidation and Bendle voters were not in favor.

Athletics

Bendle High School is a class C school district.

References

External links
Official website

School districts in Michigan
Education in Genesee County, Michigan
1925 establishments in Michigan